Heterotremata is a clade of crabs, comprising those crabs in which the genital openings are on the sternum in females, but on the legs in males. It comprises 68 families in 28 superfamilies.

Evolution
Heterotremata is the sister group to Thoracotremata within the clade Eubrachyura, having diverged during the Cretaceous period.  Eubrachyura itself is a subset of the larger clade Brachyura, which consists of all "true crabs".  A summary of the high-level internal relationships within Brachyura can be shown in the cladogram below:

The internal relationships within Heterotremata are less certain, with many of the superfamilies found to be invalid.  The proposed cladogram below is from analysis by Tsang et al, 2014:

Superfamilies

Aethroidea
Bellioidea
Bythograeoidea
Calappoidea
Cancroidea
Carpilioidea
Cheiragonoidea
Corystoidea
Dairoidea
Dorippoidea
Eriphioidea
Gecarcinucoidea
Goneplacoidea
Hexapodoidea
Leucosioidea
Majoidea
Orithyioidea
Palicoidea
Parthenopoidea
Pilumnoidea
Portunoidea
Potamoidea
Pseudothelphusoidea
Pseudozioidea
Retroplumoidea
Trapezioidea
Trichodactyloidea
Xanthoidea

However, recent studies have found the following superfamilies and families to not be monophyletic, but rather paraphyletic or polyphyletic:
The superfamilies Calappoidea, Eriphioidea, and Goneplacoidea are polyphyletic
The superfamily Potamoidea is paraphyletic with respect to Gecarcinucoidea, which is resolved by placing Gecarcinucidae within Potamoidea
The Majoidea families Epialtidae, Mithracidae and Majidae are polyphyletic with respect to each other
The Xanthoidea family Xanthidae is paraphyletic with respect to Panopeidae

References

External links

Crabs